Steve Reid (born April 6, 1955) is a retired Canadian-American football (soccer) player who played professionally in the American Soccer League, North American Soccer League and Major Indoor Soccer League.

Reid attended Mercer County Community College where he was a 1974 NJCAA First Team All American soccer player.  In 1977 and 1978, Reid played for the New Jersey Americans of the American Soccer League.  In 1979, he moved to the New England Tea Men of the North American Soccer League.  He began the 1979-1980 indoor season with the Tea Men before being traded to the Philadelphia Fever of the Major Indoor Soccer League.  He remained with the Fever until 1981.  In 1980, Reid also played for the Philadelphia Fury of the NASL. In 1981, he played for the New England Sharks of the ASL.

References

External links
 Career stats

Living people
1955 births
American soccer players
American Soccer League (1933–1983) players
Major Indoor Soccer League (1978–1992) players
North American Soccer League (1968–1984) indoor players
New England Sharks players
New England Tea Men players
New Jersey Americans (ASL) players
North American Soccer League (1968–1984) players
Philadelphia Fever (MISL) players
Philadelphia Fury (1978–1980) players
Soccer players from Montreal
Association football midfielders
Association football forwards